St. Dominic's Cathedral, locally known as the Fanchuanpu Tianzhutang, is located by the Min River, Fuzhou, Fujian, China. It is the seat of the Metropolitan Archdiocese of Fuzhou and the Ecclesiastical Province of Fuzhou.

History 
It was first established in the third year of Tongzhi in the Qing dynasty (1864) by the Spanish Dominicans. In 1911, it was erected as the cathedral church of the Archdiocese of Fuzhou. In the 21st year of the Republic of China (1932) the old building was demolished and the present cathedral was begun in an area of 1371.4 square meters that can accommodate 3,000 people. It was known as "The Grandest Church in the South of Yangtze", and it is still the largest Catholic church in Fujian today. It was said that the sound of its bells ringing can be heard from more than ten miles away.

Before 1949, of the approximately 10,000 Catholics of Fuzhou, approximately half belonged to the cathedral (5,153 people).

During the Cultural Revolution, the church was attacked by the Red Guards in 1966, who then proceeded to removing the cross from the spire atop the cathedral tower. The cathedral was closed and used for other purposes. It was reopened in 1985. In 1994, the Cathedral of St. Dominic was the center of worship of about 16,000 Catholics and still serves as the place of worship for half of the Catholic population of Fuzhou.

The cathedral complex 
Other than the cathedral itself, several other buildings form the cathedral complex. These buildings are:

 The Cathedral Rectory
 The Archdiocesan Center and Office
 The Cathedral Garden, which contains a large standing crucifix; a shrine to the Immaculate Heart of Mary/Our Lady of Fatima; a shrine to St. Therese; a statue of Sacred Heart of Jesus erected in the year 1990; a sculptural group featuring Christ as the Good Shephard; stones engraved with biblical passages in Chinese; light-up religious texts; statues of angels and various saints, including Sts. Peter and Paul the Apostles, St. John Bosco, St. Michael the Archangel, etc.

Architecture and interior

Architecture 
The cathedral is built in the neo-Gothic style, however with neo-Classical, neo-Romanesque, and Chinese touches, as respectively seen in the pillars of the nave, the rounded-arches found throughout the building, and the many of the exterior pinnacles, which makes the cathedral unique within the realm of ecclesiastical construction. The cathedral follows a typical basilica floor plan with two rows of 11 Corinthian columns separating the nave from the two aisles. The cathedral also features the ribbed groin vaults—a common feature of the medieval cathedrals of Europe. The vaults of St. Dominic's Cathedral are painted blue and dotted with stars. This is a common feature among cathedrals and churches built in the neo-Gothic style, such as the Sainte Chapelle in Paris, France, or the Notre Dame Basilica in Montreal, Canada.

Altars 
The cathedral contains five altars. The high altar of the cathedral is topped by a statue of Our Lady of the Rosary, who revealed to St. Dominic the Catholic devotion of the Rosary. There are also four side altars in four side chapels within the cathedral: the north-transept altar of St. Joseph; the south-transept altar of St. Therese; the altar at the chapel of the Sacred Heart at the rear of the north aisle, which was later rededicated to St. Vincent Ferrer; and the altar at the chapel of the Immaculate Heart of Mary at the rear of the south aisle, which was later rededicated to St. Francis Xavier in 2017, but eventually rededicated to St. Peter Sanz, a bishop of the Archdiocese of Fuzhou. The rededications of the two rear-end chapels to Sts. Vincent Ferrer and Peter Sanz is reminiscent of the cathedral's Dominican foundations and are possibly restorations of the original dedications of the altars from before the destructions brought by Cultural Revolution. The relics of St. Joseph and St. Therese are placed in the central niche of their respective altars.

Renovations 
To reverse the damages inflicted upon the cathedral during the Cultural Revolution as well as the deteriorations throughout the years, the cathedral was heavily renovated and restored in 2017. The nave column capitals were gilded to highlight the details. The walls of the cathedral, now covered with mold due to the damp climate of South China, was cleaned and whitewashed. Leaded stained-glass windows featuring simple designs were specially commissioned and installed on the west-end of the cathedral as well as the three east windows featuring the Holy Spirit and the Seven Sacraments of the Catholic Church in the chancel. In addition, a new marble high altar and Versus Populum Altar, Ambo, baptismal font, Altar of St. Joseph, and Altar of St. Therese, as well as new matching altar rails were commissioned and was installed at the cathedral. Other changes included the addition of new angel holy water basins and the removal of the curtains and the curtain rods of the nave windows.

The more complicated leaded painted stained-glass windows featuring biblical scenes and Marian Apparitions and other Catholic iconographies were later installed in the cathedral nave.

2008 cathedral rectory structural relocation 
The church was listed among the major cultural relics of Fujian Province in 1996. Owing to Fuzhou's urban development of the South Riverside Avenue in 2008, which was projected to go through where the cathedral rectory was standing, the cathedral rectory was structurally relocated. The cathedral rectory structural relocation was conducted by the Academy of Building Research in order to make some modifications without altering its beauty and original conception. The cathedral rectory was moved 80 meters from its original location and rotated 90 degrees to make way for the street construction.

References

Churches in Fuzhou
Churches in Fujian
Roman Catholic cathedrals in China
Tourist attractions in Fujian
Tourist attractions in Fuzhou
Cathedral architecture
Catholicism in China
Catholicism in Asia
Dominican churches
Gothic Revival church buildings in China